Brammallite is a sodium rich analogue of illite.  First described in 1943 for an occurrence in Llandybie, Carmarthenshire, Wales, it was named for British geologist and mineralogist Alfred Brammall (1879–1954).

Believed to be a degradation product of paragonite, like illite it is a non-expanding, clay-sized, micaceous mineral. Brammallite is a phyllosilicate or layered silicate. Structurally, brammallite is quite similar to muscovite or sericite with slightly more silicon, magnesium, iron, and water and slightly less tetrahedral aluminium and interlayer potassium.

It occurs as aggregates of small monoclinic white crystals. Due to the small size, positive identification usually requires x-ray diffraction analysis.

References

Phyllosilicates
Potassium minerals
Aluminium minerals
Magnesium minerals
Monoclinic minerals